Hassan Mubarak (born 13 April 1968) is a footballer from the United Arab Emirates.

He scored a goal in the 1997 FIFA Confederations Cup.

References

External links
 
 

1968 births
Living people
Emirati footballers
United Arab Emirates international footballers
1996 AFC Asian Cup players
1997 FIFA Confederations Cup players
UAE Pro League players
Association football defenders
Al-Nasr SC (Dubai) players